Marjaniemi is a seaside residential area in eastern Helsinki, Finland, with a population of approximately 2,000. Administratively it forms a quarter in the neighbourhood of Vartiokylä.

Marjaniemi is a sought-after neighborhood, and the real estate prices rank among the highest in the city.

Politics
Results of the 2011 Finnish parliamentary election in Marjaniemi:

National Coalition Party   41.7%
Social Democratic Party   18.0%
True Finns   12.2%
Green League   9.5%
Left Alliance   6.6%
Swedish People's Party   4.6%
Centre Party   3.7%
Christian Democrats   1.9%

External links
 

Quarters of Helsinki